The Centro de Estudios Científicos y Tecnológicos also known as CECyT (in English: Center of Scientific and Technological Studies) is a state Bachillerato Bivalente system in Mexico, belonging to the National Polytechnic Institute (IPN).

There are 19 CECyT's and one Centro de Estudios Tecnológicos, CET (in English: Center of Technological Studies) located primarily in Mexico City. They are commonly known as Vocacionales.

Schools 

There are 15 Centros de Estudios Científicos y Tecnológicos  and one Centro de Estudios Tecnológicos located in Mexico City. The CECyT 3 is located in Ecatepec, State of Mexico. Recently, two CECyT were created outside Greater Mexico City, one in the Guanajuato other in Hidalgo and in Zacatecas. Each school has number and a name (commonly referred to a name of names of historical figures or those who helped to create the national polytechnic.

The CECyT and CET offer studies in three branches of knowledge: Engineering and Physical-Mathematic Sciences, Biomedical Sciences and Social and Administrative Sciences, featuring 78 programs in the on-site courses. They are located as follows:

References

External links
 Dirección de Educación Media Superior IPN
 Official IPN website

High schools in Mexico
Instituto Politécnico Nacional